Jack Creek (also known as Jack Hawn Creek) is a stream in northeastern Bollinger County in the U.S. state of Missouri. It is a tributary of Buck Creek.

The headwater location is one-half mile north of Missouri Route 72 and one mile northeast of Patton Junction and approximately 1.5 miles north-northeast of Patton.

Jack Creek has the name of Jack Hawn, an early citizen.

See also
List of rivers of Missouri

References

Rivers of Bollinger County, Missouri
Rivers of Missouri